Cristhian Subero (born 26 May 1991) is a Colombian football player, who currently plays as a right back for Atlético Bucaramanga in the Categoría Primera A.

Subero is a product of the Millonarios youth system and played with the Millonarios first team between 2009 and 2012.

Statistics (Official games/Colombian Ligue and Colombian Cup)
(As of November 14, 2010)

References

External links
BDFA profile 

1991 births
Living people
Colombian footballers
Categoría Primera A players
Categoría Primera B players
Millonarios F.C. players
Boyacá Chicó F.C. footballers
Patriotas Boyacá footballers
América de Cali footballers
Real Cartagena footballers
Unión Magdalena footballers
Atlético Bucaramanga footballers
Association football defenders
People from Santa Marta
Sportspeople from Magdalena Department